The Central Intercollegiate Conference (CIC) was an American intercollegiate athletic conference that operated from 1928 to 1968. It was less often referred to as the Central Intercollegiate Athletic Conference (CIAC), particularly towards the beginning of its existence. Formed in late 1927, the conference initially had seven members, all located in the state of Kansas, and began play in early 1928. Many of the league's members went on to form the Central States Intercollegiate Conference (CSIC) in 1976.

Member schools

Final members
{| class="wikitable sortable" style="text-align:center"
! Institution
! Location
! Affiliation
! Enrollment
! Nickname
! Joined
! Left
! Subsequentconference
! Currentconference
|-
| Kansas State Teachers College
| Emporia, Kansas
| rowspan="5" | Public
| 5,887
| Hornets
| 1927–28
| 1967–68
| various
| Mid-America (MIAA) (NCAA D-II)(1991–92 to present)
|-
| Kansas State Teachers College in Hays
| Hays, Kansas
| 14,658
| Tigers
| 1927–28
| 1967–68
| various
| Mid-America (MIAA) (NCAA D-II)(2006–07 to present)
|-
| Kansas State Teachers College in Pittsburg| Pittsburg, Kansas
| 7,102
| Gorillas
| 1927–28
| 1967–68
| various
| Mid-America (MIAA) (NCAA D-II)(1989–90 to present)
|-
| University of Omaha| Omaha, Nebraska
| 15,431
| Indians
| 1959–60
| 1967–68
| various
| Summit (NCAA D-I)(2012–13 to present)
|-
| Washburn University'| Topeka, Kansas
| 7,971
| Ichabods
| 1927–28,1940–41
| 1932–33,1967–68
| various
| Mid-America (MIAA) (NCAA D-II)(1989–90 to present)
|}

Notes

Former members

Notes

Membership timeline

Football champions

1928 – College of Emporia
1929 – Kansas State Teachers
1930 – Washburn
1931 – Washburn and Wichita
1932 – Wichita
1933 – Wichita
1934 – Kansas State Teachers–Hays
1935 – Kansas State Teachers–Hays, Kansas State Teachers–Pittsburg, Wichita
1936 – Kansas State Teachers–Hays
1937 – Wichita
1938 – Wichita
1939 – Wichita
1940 – St. Benedict's
1941 – Kansas State Teachers–Pittsburg

1942 – Kansas State Teachers–Pittsburg
1943 – No champion1944 – No champion1945 – No champion''
1946 – Southwestern (KS)
1947 – Kansas State Teachers
1948 – Kansas State Teachers
1949 – Kansas State Teachers–Pittsburg and Washburn
1950 – Kansas State Teachers
1951 – Kansas State Teachers and Kansas State Teachers–Pittsburg
1952 – Kansas State Teachers
1953 – St. Benedict's and Washburn
1954 – Kansas State Teachers–Hays and Washburn
1955 – Kansas State Teachers–Pittsburg

1956 – St. Benedict's
1957 – Pittsburg State
1958 – St. Benedict's
1959 – St. Benedict's
1960 – St. Benedict's
1961 – Pittsburg State
1962 – Omaha
1963 – Omaha
1964 – Washburn
1965 – Omaha
1966 – Fort Hays State and Pittsburg State
1967 – Omaha
1968 – Nebraska–Omaha

See also
List of defunct college football conferences

References

 
College sports in Kansas
College sports in Missouri
College sports in Nebraska
Sports leagues established in 1928
Sports leagues disestablished in 1968